How Sleep the Brave, is a 1982 Vietnam war film shot in England. It stars Lawrence Day, Luis Manuel, Thomas M. Polland and Christopher Muncke, and is produced by Lindsay Shonteff and Elizabeth Laurie, written by Bobby Bauer and Jeremy Lee Francis, and directed by Lindsay Shonteff.

Synopsis
During the Vietnam War of Christmas 1969, a group of fresh young American soldiers who arrive at an army camp in Vietnam are sent to patrol in a nearby jungle. Once they have killed a few Viet Cong soldiers and losing a couple of their comrades in the battle, they return to camp. They are now sent on a mission, which is to destroy a Viet Cong village. After they destroy the village, they embark on a hazardous journey through a jungle to board a helicopter and return to camp. But, it's only a matter of who will survive the Viet Cong's gunshots and make it to the helicopter.

External links

1982 films
1980s war films
Films directed by Lindsay Shonteff
Vietnam War films
Films shot in England
British war films
1982 in England
1980s English-language films
1980s British films